Ab Mu or Ab Mow or Abmu may refer to:
 Ab Mu-ye Olya
 Ab Mu-ye Sofla